Mantleoma is a benign neoplasm with mantle differentiation and they tend to occur on the face, early neoplasms consist only of cords and columns of undifferentiated epithelial cells.

See also 
 Trichodiscoma
 Fibrofolliculoma

References 

Epidermal nevi, neoplasms, and cysts